The Roar of the Butterflies is an upcoming Spanish–Colombian television series created by Juan Pablo Buscarini set in the Dominican Republic, during Rafael Trujillo's dictatorship. It will be released in Latin America by Star+ whereas Filmax will handle the rest of international sales.

Premise 
Set in the 1950s Dominican Republic, during the dictatorship of Rafael Leónidas Trujillo, the fiction focuses on the relationship between idealist Minerva Mirabal, one of the Mirabal sisters, and Arantxa Oyamburu, a Spanish immigrant.

Cast 
 Sandy Hernández as Minerva Mirabal
 Camila Issa as María Teresa Mirabal
 Susana Abaitua as Arantxa Oyamburu
 Essined Aponte as Dedé Mirabal
  as Rafael Leónidas Trujillo
 Alina Robert as 
 Mario Espitia as Pedro González 
 Sergio Borrero as Protocol Host 
 Freddy Beltrán as Juan Ramón Sáenz
 Alejandra Borrero as Gretchen
 Belén Rueda
 Mercedes San Pietro 
 Willy Toledo

Production 
Created by showrunner , The Roar of the Butterflies is produced by Gloriamundi Producciones, Tandem Films, Debut y Despedida and Mediabyte. directing credits include Mariano Hueter, Leandro Ipiña and Inés París. The writing team consists of Azucena Rodríguez, Ricardo Rodríguez, Juan Pablo Buscarini, Juan Carballo, Gabriel Nicoli and Pablo E. Bossi.

Consisting of 13 episodes, filming in Colombia was reported to have begun by August 2021.

References 

Television shows set in the Dominican Republic
Spanish-language television shows
Upcoming drama television series
Television shows filmed in Colombia
Argentine drama television series
Spanish drama television series
Television series set in the 1950s
Star+ original programming